"Time is of the essence" is a term used in contract law in England and Wales (a legal jurisdiction within the United Kingdom), Canada, Australia, New Zealand, other Commonwealth countries and the United States, expressing "the need for timely completion", i.e. indicating that one or more parties to the agreement must perform by the time to which the parties have agreed if a delay will cause material harm. However, in the case of Foundation Development Corp. v. Loehmann's Inc. 788 P.2d 1189 (Arizona 1990), in which the lease included a Time is of the essence clause, the court ruled that a minor delay did not cause material harm and thus no breach of contract occurred.

"Time is of the essence" may be contrasted with "reasonable time", where a delay in performing may be justified if it is reasonably required, based upon subjective circumstances such as unexpected weather, and with the phrase time at large, which describes a situation where there is no date for completion, or where the date for completion has become invalid or unenforceable. The contractor is then no longer bound by the obligation to complete the contract by a certain date. 

"Time is of the essence" may also be contrasted with an "express condition", where a specific contract term must be performed to avoid breach, such as in the Court of Appeals of Indiana's decision in Dove v. Rose Acre Farms, Inc. 434 N.E.2d 931 (Ct. App. Ind. 1982).

Time at large
"Time at large" is a common law principle  which can arise in four types of situation:
where no time for performance has ever been agreed as part of the contract
where a time which was fixed has ceased to apply, by agreement or an act which prevents its fulfillment, including an employer's act of prevention affecting completion
where the employer has waived the right to insist on completion by the agreed date, or where the contractor is in breach of contract but the employer elects to continue with the contract on a delayed basis, or
where the employer has failed to comply with the certification process, if this prevents the contract being administered correctly.

The case of Holme v Guppy (1838) confirms that "if the party be prevented by the refusal of the other contracting party from completing the contract within the time limited he is not liable in law for the default".

Where time is "at large", the contractor's obligation is to complete within a reasonable time. The facts of the case will determine what is a reasonable time. Bellhouse and Cowan note that most forms of contract now have "adequate extension of time procedures", so has become difficult to argue that an "at large" situation has arisen in most situations.

"The principle in Bramall & Ogden" (referring to the case of Bramall & Ogden v Sheffield City Council (1983) 29 BLR 73) established that confused legal drafting can give rise to a situation where time is "at large" due to the absence of agreement on contractual time for performance. In this case, Sheffield had contracted for the construction of 123 houses, which were completed on various dates. The contract provided for liquidated damages applicable on the number of houses incomplete, and stated a date for completion as 6 December 1976. The contract did not provide for sectional completion and the court held that the sectional basis on which the liquidated damages clause was to operate was inconsistent with the single end-date for anticipated completion, meaning that Sheffield were unable to enforce a damages claim for delay.

"Time at large" arguments may also be utilised in a civil law context.

See also
 Date certain
 Reasonable time

References

Contract law